Pop Life is a British documentary series about pop music, shown on BBC Two, narrated by Suranne Jones. It comprises three episodes, each of which is an hour in duration.

Episode 1: I'm in a Boy Band! 
Focusing on Boy Bands from The Beatles to One Direction. 
Air date – 25 February 2012

Episode 2: I'm in a Girl Group! 
Focusing on the equivalent female acts.
Air date – 3 March 2012

Episode 3: I'm a Pop Star! 
Focusing on solo acts.
Air date – 10 March 2012

References

External links 

2012 British television series debuts
2012 British television series endings
2010s British music television series
BBC television documentaries